The 1999 New Hampshire Wildcats football team was an American football team that represented the University of New Hampshire as a member of the Atlantic 10 Conference during the 1999 NCAA Division I-AA football season. In its first year under head coach Sean McDonnell, the team compiled a 5–6 record (3–5 against conference opponents) and finished in a tie for sixth place in the Atlantic 10 Conference.

Schedule

References

New Hampshire
New Hampshire Wildcats football seasons
New Hampshire Wildcats football